Brian Gottfried and Raúl Ramírez were the defending champions and won in the final 7–5, 6–3 against Fred McNair and Sherwood Stewart.

Seeds
Champion seeds are indicated in bold text while text in italics indicates the round in which those seeds were eliminated.

Draw

Final

Top half

Bottom half

External links
 1977 Volvo International Doubles draw

Doubles